Luis Flores may refer to:

Sportspeople

Association football
Luis Flores (Mexican footballer) (born 1961), Mexican former footballer
Luis Flores (footballer, born 1964), Peruvian football midfielder
Luis Flores Manzor (born 1982), Chilean footballer
Luis Flores Abarca (born 1982), Chilean footballer
Luis Flores (soccer, born April 2002), American soccer player
Luis Flores (Bolivian footballer) (born 2002)

Other sports
Luis Flores (basketball) (born 1981), Dominican basketball player
Luis Flores (decathlete) (born 1947), Guatemalan Olympic athlete
Luis Flores (sprinter) (born 1978), Spanish Olympic athlete
Luis Flores (triple jumper) (born 1967), Honduran Olympic athlete
Luis-Manuel Flores (born 1985), Mexican tennis player

Other
Luis Flores, character in Fear the Walking Dead
Luis A. Flores, Peruvian lawyer, politician and diplomat